Ke Yan (1929 – 11 December 2011) was a Chinese writer.

Ke Yan was born in the province Guangdong. Her father was a writer and a translator, and she has stated that she was first inspired by him to start writing. A playwright, novelist and poet, Ke Yan is famous for her textbooks and children's literature. She has also written lyrics and a script for a television program. Throughout her life, she held several positions, including Vice Chief-Editor of Poetry Magazine, Editor of People's Literature, Vice-President of the Children's Educational Society of Beijing, and National Committee member of the Chinese Federation of the Art and Literature Circles.

Famous works by Ke Yan include Stories of a Little Soldier and Little Muddleheaded Aunt.

References

External links
Translation of poetry by Ke Yan

Chinese women poets
People's Republic of China poets
Chinese dramatists and playwrights
Writers from Zhengzhou
1929 births
2011 deaths
Chinese children's writers
Chinese women children's writers
Women dramatists and playwrights
20th-century Chinese women writers
21st-century Chinese women writers
Poets from Henan
20th-century Chinese poets
20th-century Chinese novelists
20th-century Chinese dramatists and playwrights
Chinese women novelists